Munai, officially the Municipality of Munai (Maranao: Inged a Munai;), is a 4th class municipality in the province of Lanao del Norte, Philippines. According to the 2020 census, it has a population of 35,020 people.

History
Munai has govern by Sultanate before and still adopting the rules and regulations of Sultanate. The Center of the Munai is surround by elevation and mountains, and atmosphere which attraction for the local tourists. There are two huge natural springs jointly together going street to Pagayawan Falls in the municipality of Bacolod.

Traditional Government
The people in Munai are still adopting the traditional government that is eventually govern by Supreme Sultanates. They are in charge for Social Life of the people and Tribal Conflict.
Datu Salaginto Mawarao is the Patriarch of Munai's Sultanate (Scion of Butig and Maguindanao, descendant from Saripada Macaalang the first Iranaon Datu who ruled Maguindanao) married to Bai Labiya sa Munai and Lupung (Ancestors of Munai in Mala a Bayabao, Lanao Del Sur)

Four (4) "Moriatao" Sultanates alternate succession to the throne “Sultan sa Munai”:
Sultan Labia
Sultan Obinay
Sultan Riyona
Sultan Balowa
Potre Motiya married to Pipis a Datu (Their Biological Sister, and she is not part of succession to the Throne because she is female)

Six (6) "Moriatao" Datus of Munai:
Sultan Labia
Sultan Obinay
Sultan Riyona
Sultan Balowa
Sultan Tomarompong: from Municipality of Ramain who married daughter of Mutia long-long time ago 
Sultan

Children (Moriatao) of Potre Motiya married to Pipis a Datu:
Bandara
Tangong
Arambun
Ansabo sa Sapad
Andonkay sa Dimayo
Mainad sa Uyaan married to Ampaso sa Binidayan begot Bai Amba sa Unayan and Munai

Community Sultan:
 Sultan of Kaburasan
 Sultan of Panggao
 Sultan of Lininding

Folk History of Mutia Family
Originally and before Spain Invasion and later American Invasion, the tradition of the Maranao letters.

Major Traditional and Political Conflict
Mutia Family and Lukesadatu Family: the great-great grandfather of these two (2) families are very close relatives in which the father side blood is Lukesadatu Family and Mother side blood is Mutia Family. These two (2) families are rich in Natural Heritance and also very close influential to half of the (26) Barangays thru the social justice, social economic, politics and social progress in municipality of Munai because the most of their Elders are very kind and generous and also united, but all of their relations has suddenly stop because of the following points by order way back in 1990s:
Power or Authority
Boundary of the Land (less than 50 square meters) located in Old Poblacion, which belong to their great-great-great grandfather
Local Politics
Business Project
Connection

Martial Law Era
Munai is one of the Municipalities suffered during Martial Law in 1972. Almost people living in Munai at that time were abandoned their home, livestock, land, etc. and they moved to boundary somewhere in Lanao del Sur and Lanao del Norte. Most of the people stay meanwhile to Barangay Lininding of Munai, a boundary of Municipality of Piagapo, Lanao del Sur. The only remaining people that time of evacuation process were the Moro (Male and Female including Children) Fighters and one of their Leaders Commander was Former Lieutenant (Philippine Army) Commander Tagoranao "James Bond" Goldiano Macapaar bin Sabbar, a MNLF Top Commander for Lanao del Norte. Late Commander James Bond is the sibling of MILF Top Commander Abdullah Goldiano Macapaar bin Sabbar "Commander Bravo". Moro Rebels from Munai had a fight side by side with the Moro Rebels from neighboring Tangkal against Philippines Constabulary (PC) Army.

Dominant MILF-MNLF
Majority of people living in Munai are all maranao tribe and they are supporters of MILF and MNLF. MILF Military Training Camp called Camp Bilal is a big MILF military Camp in Lanao del Norte.

Geography
Geographically, Munai is bounded by the municipalities of Tangcal, Bacolod and Kauswagan on the north, Poona Piagapo on the east, Piagapo on the south, and Madalum on the west.

Barangays
Munai is politically subdivided into 26 barangays.

Climate

Demographics

Religion
Location of mosques:
Tambo (Poblacion), can accommodate 200 to 300 people
Old Poblacion, Can accommodate 100 to 200 people

Economy

List of local products
Corn, primary business for agriculture
Rice farm (Basak in Maranao Term), primary business for agriculture
Coconut, primary business for agriculture
Abaca
Lumber
Livestock
Falcata
Banana
Fish Pond

Government
Elected officials 2016 - 2019:
 Municipal Mayor: Rocma Andamama
 Vice Mayor: Dante Batingolo
 Sangguniang Bayan:
 Muamar Aninter
 Hanan Guyo
 Aiman Mutia
 Laboy Acmad
 Puyat Macaan
 Jasmin Batalo
 Unda Sarip
 Hafiz Ryan Alinog
 ABC President: Ramel Maquiling
 SB Secretary: Ms. Nesrin Batalo

List of former mayors
During Martial Law:
 1971 - 1972: Sultan Sandangan Amuntao Balowa
 1972 - 1973: H. Malik / Baraguir Balabagan
 1974 - 1976: H. Usman / Macaan T. Condado
After People Power Revolution of 1986:

List of former vice mayors
Vice mayors after People Power Revolution 1986:

Education

References

External links
 Munai Profile at the DTI Cities and Municipalities Competitive Index
 [ Philippine Standard Geographic Code]
Philippine Census Information
Local Governance Performance Management System

Municipalities of Lanao del Norte